Biszcza , until 1999 Biszcza Pierwsza, is a village in Biłgoraj County, Lublin Voivodeship, in eastern Poland. It is the seat of the gmina (administrative district) called Gmina Biszcza.

The village has a population of 1,901.

References

Villages in Biłgoraj County
Kholm Governorate